Subi Reef, also known as Zamora Reef; Zhubi Reef (Mandarin ); , is a reef in the Spratly Islands of the South China Sea located  southwest of Philippines' Pag-asa island Thitu Island under the municipality of the Kalayaan Island Group, Palawan province as claimed by Philippines. It is occupied by China (PRC), and claimed by Taiwan (ROC) and Vietnam. According to the claims of the PRC, it currently falls under the de facto jurisdiction of Nansha islands, Sansha city, Hainan province, China. But under the clauses of the UNCLOS, which the PRC is also a signatory, the international law (if applied) only the Philippines has the maritime rights to exploit its resources or build structures, as it is within the continental shelf ("Extended Continental Shelf") of the coastal country.

Topography and features 

Naturally above water only at low tide, the reef surrounds a lagoon. The People's Republic of China has constructed a 4-story building, a weather observation station with doppler weather radar, wharfs, and an airport in the area.

UNCLOS Maritime Ruling 
On 12 July 2016, the UNCLOS special arbitral tribunal in the Philippines v. China case confirmed that Subi Reef is, or in its natural condition was, exposed at low tide and submerged at high tide and is, accordingly a low-tide elevation that does not generate entitlement to a territorial sea, exclusive economic zone or continental shelf, but is within 12 miles of a high-tide feature, Sandy Cay on the reefs west of Pag-asa Island (Thitu Island).

As the Subi Reef is under the water, it is considered by the Third United Nations Conference on the Law of the Sea (UNCLOS III) as "sea bed" in "international waters". Although the PRC had ratified a limited UNCLOS III not allowing innocent passage of warships, according to the UNCLOS III, features built on the sea bed cannot have territorial waters. Therefore, the PRC's claims and build-up on the reef are illegal. The Philippines however, having a limited naval force, was unable to enforce occupation over the reef.

Environmental issues 
The PRC has ratified UNCLOS III; the convention establishes general obligations for safeguarding the marine environment and protecting freedom of scientific research on the high seas, and also creates an innovative legal regime for controlling mineral resource exploitation in deep seabed areas beyond national jurisdiction, through an International Seabed Authority and the Common heritage of mankind principle.

Territorial disputes 

The reef is controlled by China (PRC), with a 2014 estimate of 200 troops stationed there, and claimed by Taiwan (ROC), and Vietnam. In July 2012, a large fleet of 30 Chinese fishing vessels arrived at the reef from Hainan.

In April 2015, a Philippine Navy aircraft patrolling near the reef received "aggressive action" from a Chinese ship. Also in 2015, the USS Lassen sailed within 12 nautical miles (which if applicable is the territorial waters limit of the reef), prompting the Chinese Foreign Ministry to call the action a "provocation" and vowed to keep building up in the South China Sea. As per the US Navy, this was a routine "freedom of navigation" exercise. Similar exercises are performed routinely about 12–28 times per year.

In November 2015, two U.S. B-52 strategic bombers flew in airspace near the area. They were contacted by Chinese ground control, but were allowed to continue their mission undeterred. In April 2016 a new lighthouse 55 meters (180') high commenced operations. A civilian test flight to the new airport was conducted by a passenger jet of Hainan Airlines on July 13, 2016.

See also 
 Fiery Cross Reef
 Great wall of sand
 Mischief Reef
 Nine-dotted line

References

External links

 Asia Maritime Transparency Initiative Island Tracker
 Maps of Paracels and Spratlys

Reefs of China
Reefs of the Philippines
Reefs of Taiwan
Reefs of Vietnam
Reefs of the Spratly Islands
Landforms of Khánh Hòa province
Artificial islands of Asia
Disputed reefs
Coastal fortifications